To'omata Lilomaiava Tua (10 July 1905 – February 1970) was a Western Samoan chief and politician. He served as a member of the Legislative Assembly from 1951 and as Minister of Lands from 1959, holding both roles until his death in 1970.

Biography
Born in 1905, Tua was conferred with the chiefly title To'omata in 1924. He became a member of the Fono of Faipule and served as its chairman.

He was elected to the Legislative Assembly from the Satupa'itea constituency in 1951. After being re-elected in 1954, he was appointed to the Executive Council. When a Member System was introduced in 1956, he was given the Agriculture portfolio. Although he was re-elected again in 1957, he was omitted from the Executive Council. However, when a full cabinet system was introduced in 1959, he was appointed Minister of Lands.

In 1960 he was a member of the Constitutional Assembly that drew up the independence constitution. He was re-elected in 1961, 1964 and 1967, retaining his ministerial portfolio on each occasion; in 1964 the role became Minister for Land and Land Registry.

Tua was re-elected in the February 1970 elections, but died before the Assembly convened to elect the Prime Minister. His death deprived incumbent Prime Minister Fiame Mata'afa of a majority in a tied vote, and led to Tupua Tamasese Lealofi IV becoming Prime Minister.

References

1905 births
Samoan chiefs
Members of the Legislative Assembly of Samoa
Government ministers of Samoa
1970 deaths